The Drama Desk Award for Outstanding Music is an annual award presented by Drama Desk in recognition of achievements in the theatre among Broadway, Off Broadway and Off-Off Broadway productions. The award was originally entitled Best Composer, before being renamed to its current title in 1969. The award is often referred to as Outstanding Score of a Musical.

Winners and nominees

1960s

1970s

1980s

1990s

2000s

2010s

2020s

Multiple wins

 5 wins
 Cy Coleman
 Stephen Sondheim

 3 wins
 Al Carmines
 Jason Robert Brown
 Andrew Lloyd Webber
 David Yazbek

 2 wins
 Marvin Hamlisch

Multiple nominations

 12 nominations
 Stephen Sondheim

 7 nominations
 Andrew Lloyd Webber
 Jeanine Tesori

 6 nominations
 Cy Coleman
 Stephen Flaherty
 Alan Menken

 5 nominations
 John Kander
 David Yazbek

 4 nominations
 Jason Robert Brown
 Michael John LaChiusa
 Dave Malloy

 3 nominations
 Marvin Hamlisch
 Andrew Lippa
 Laurence O'Keefe
 Charles Strouse
 Elizabeth Swados
 Maury Yeston
 Frank Wildhorn

 2 nominations
 Al Carmines
 William Finn
 Michael Friedman
 Larry Grossman
 Jerry Herman
 Joe Iconis
 Michel Legrand
 Robert Lopez
 Galt MacDermot
 Peter Mills
 Lin-Manuel Miranda
 Polly Pen
 Marc Shaiman
 Duncan Sheik
 David Shire

See also
 Tony Award for Best Original Score

References

External links
 Drama Desk official website

Music